Blommersia is a genus of frogs in the mantellid subfamily Mantellinae. This genus is restricted to Madagascar. At present it contains 11 species. It was formerly a subgenus of the genus Mantidactylus but was elevated to genus-level in 2006.

Species

References

 
Amphibians of Sub-Saharan Africa
Endemic fauna of Madagascar
Mantellidae
Amphibian genera